Socialist Party of Croatia (Croatian: Socijalistička stranka Hrvatske or Socijalistički savez Hrvatske - Savez socijalista Hrvatske, SSH) was a left-wing political party in Croatia.

Before the arrival of multi-party democracy to Croatia, SSH existed as Socialist League of Working People of Croatia, mass-umbrella organisation for all political organisations other than Croatian Communist Party. Before 1990 parliamentary elections, SSRNH rebranded itself into SSH, just like Communists rebranded themselves into Social Democratic Party of Croatia. At the election, two parties acted as a bloc and ultimately lost.

While SDP continued to exist nominally as the strongest opposition in Parliament, SSH, after losing its reason for existence, began to slowly fade away.

It was briefly reinvigorated when prominent Zagreb attorney Silvije Degen took leadership and ran as relatively successful candidate during the 1992 presidential elections.

The SSH should not be mistaken for Socialist Party of Croatia - Left Alternative (Croatian: Socijalistička partija Hrvatske), which had been formed by people around Stipe Šuvar, at the time a dissident of Socialist Labour Party of Croatia.

Their successors are Social Democratic Action of Croatia, formed in 1994.

See also
 Social Democratic Party of Croatia
 Serbian Party of Socialists (Croatia)
 Socialist Labour Party of Croatia
 Socialist Party of Croatia – Left Alternative
 Social Democratic Union (Croatia)
 Action of Social Democrats of Croatia
 Left of Croatia
 Hrvatska ljevica
 Novi Plamen

References

Defunct political parties in Croatia
Socialist parties in Croatia